Kecksburg may refer to:

 Kecksburg, Pennsylvania, United States
 Kecksburg UFO incident, a purported Unidentified Flying Object incident in 1965 near Kecksburg in Western Pennsylvania